Babu Jagdeo Prasad (2 February 1922 – 5 September 1974), alternatively spelled as Jagdev Prasad and popularly known as Jagdev Babu, was an Indian politician and a member of the Bihar Legislative Assembly who served as Bihar's deputy chief minister in 1968 for four days in the Satish Prasad Singh cabinet. A socialist and a proponent of Arjak culture, he was the founder of Shoshit Dal (later Shoshit Samaj Dal) and was a staunch antagonist and critic of India's caste system. He was nicknamed as the "Lenin of Bihar".

Life
Prasad was a member of the Dangi, subcaste of the  Koeri caste, and was referred to as the "Lenin of Bihar" due to his charisma. He led the Shoshit Samaj Dal and during the early 1970s, at the height of the caste tensions known as the Bihar Movement, he was able to attract much support from both members of the Other Backward Classes and the Dalits in their opposition to upper-caste landlords.

Jagdeo Prasad's son, Nagmani is a veteran politician who started his career from his father's party itself. He later joined Rashtriya Janata Dal and remained minister in RJD government. The former Chief Minister of Bihar, Satish Prasad Singh, who held the office for shortest tenure in Bihar's history as a nominee of Shoshit Samaj Dal, was brother in law of Jagdeo Prasad.

Career
Born in Kurtha village, Jahanabad district of Bihar; Jagdeo Prasad went to Jahanabad town for higher studies. He further moved to Patna University, from where he  pursued his post graduation studies. Jagdeo is said to have revolutionary mindset since his early childhood as in his adolescence, he fought to end prevailing practices like "Panchkathia System", in which farmers had to leave 5 katta of their land for the elephant of landlord to graze.

Later, he came into contact with  Chandradeo Prasad Verma, who persuaded him to study the political philosophers to know the prevalent societal condition in depth. Jagdeo agreed and soon he became sympathetic to idea of socialism. Later, he joined Samyukta Socialist Party and in the days of ideological wars between Ram Manohar Lohia and Jayprakash Narayan, he chose to go with Lohia. Jagdeo also became editor of the magazine of  SSP  called Janata. Later he moved to Hyderabad and started editing two more magazines Uday and Citizen. His ideas brought great fame to the magazines but he had to face intimidation from orthodox section of society. This led him to leave the magazine and move to Patna  once again.

Though, initially he remained an active member of SSP, he later realised that the fruits of labour of many are reaped by few in the party and given his ideological difference with Lohia, he resigned and formed a new party called Shoshit Samaj Party (SSP).
He also remained active member of Arjak Sangh, a platform led by Ramswaroop Verma.
The Shoshit Samaj Party was more a revolutionary organisation than a political party as it urged the landless labourers to grab the lands of landlords, a practice which gave rise to a number of caste armies and private senas in Bihar.  

Due to his critic of upper caste dominance, Prasad many a times is branded as Anti-forward caste. He remained Deputy Chief Minister of Bihar for a brief period of time when SSP was at peak. Prasad was called as Bihar's Lenin in his lifetime due to his radical views, he also  coined the politically radical slogan of:

Death

Prasad  was killed by police on 5 September 1974 while leading a protest involving 20,000 people. There have been claims that his death was ordered by a minister in the Government of Bihar, although police said that the protesters were not peaceful, as claimed, and instead were armed.
Vinayak Prasad Yadav, then a member of the Samyukta Socialist Party, resigned from the Legislative Assembly of Bihar in protest of this killing at Kurtha.

References

Further reading

1922 births
Indian political philosophers
Bihari politicians
1974 deaths
Political repression in India
Assassinated Indian people
People murdered in Bihar
People shot dead by law enforcement officers in India
People from Jehanabad district
Communist Party of India politicians from Bihar